Professor Abdul Shakoor Rashad was born on November 14, 1921, in Kandahar city, Afghanistan.

Early life 
Abdul Shakoor Rashad graduated from school at the age of 12 in 1933. While he was only 13 years old, he was appointed as a teacher in school in 1934 from where he started his official career.

In 1948, Abdul Shakoor went to India for further education where he continued his research in Pashto language. While he was in India, he wrote the book "Lodi Pashtoons" consisting of (351) pages and learned Hindi Language.

Academic life 
In 1957, Abdul Shakoor became a member of the Pashto Tolana (Pashto Academy) and a professor of Pashto language at the Faculty of Language and Literature at the Kabul University. Later on he became the Assistant Director of pashto Tolana.

In 1961, he was appointed as a Pashto teacher in the Institute of Eastern Research in St. Petersburg (Previously known as Lenin Grad) where he served for two and a half years. He moved back to Kabul where he continued to serve as a professor at the University of Kabul in the Faculty of Language and Literature as Professor and as the Chief of the Pashto Department.

Professor Rashad besides his native language Pashto spoke fluent Persian, Arabic, Urdu, Hindi, Russian and English. He also had knowledge of Sanskrit, Japanese and other regional languages. He had written poems in Persian and Urdu languages as well. However has devoted all his life in study and research of Pashto literature.

Reshad knew 6 languages including Sanskrit and Hebrew. He has written around 105 books (only 36 were published) and hundreds of articles.

In 2004, due to his numerous efforts in the fields of Art, Science, Philosophy, History and Literature, he was given the title of "Alama"(Laureate, Academician) by the Govt. of Afghanistan and he was greeted by the then Governor of Kandahar Province Mohammad Yousaf Pashtun by organizing a seminar by his name for his remarkable efforts and official giving him the title of "Alama".

Political life 
In 1946, Abdul Shakoor was appointed as the Director of Kandahar City Selection Committee and in 1947 he became the Deputy Mayor of Kandahar City.

At the age of 26, Abdul Shakoor joined the "Weesh Zalmian - ويښ زلميان (Awaken Youth)", an Afghan youth movement. In 1952, he was elected as a representative of Weesh Zalmian to the parliament. But due to the opposition of Governor Abdul Ghani Khan and the officials of that time, his vote box was confiscated by the police from the election bureau. In this movement the high-profile leaders, writers, activists such as Hasham Maiwandwal(Prime Minister of Afghanistan), Abdul Rauf Benawa, Sadiqullah Reshteen, Faiz Mohammad Angar, Khwakhuzhi Sahib, Abdul Hye Habibi, Noor Mohammad Angar, Bari Jahani, Habibullah Rafi, Gul Pacha Ulfat, Basarki Sahab and others were associated with him.

Abdul Shakoor remained in Afghanistan during the Russian invasion of Afghanistan (1979–1989) and the Civil War in Afghanistan followed by the withdrawal of the Russian forces form Afghanistan. He wrote several poems and articles critical of the communist regimes during the Soviet occupation and the warlords during the civil war. For security reasons, most of his works were published by alias names.

Abdul Shakoor Rashad retired after the communist coup in 1978. However, he always kept a close academic relation with the institutions and other academics.

He died on 1 December 2004 at the age of 83 in Kabul, Afghanistan and he was buried in Kandahar University Campus in Kandahar city.

Books
A prolific writer, some of his notable publications include:
Ḥaz̤rat Abū Bakr Ṣiddīq, on the life and eminence of first Muslim Caliph Abū Bakr, d. 634
Puṣhtānah shuʻarāʼ : bashpaṛ matn, collective biography of Pushto poets from ancient times to 20th century from Afghanistan and Pakistan; includes samples from their works
Da Kandahār yādāṣhtūnah, historical and cultural study of Kandahār, Province of Afghanistan from ancient times to 20th century
Da Dawlat Lawāṇay dīwān, Pashto poetry
Lodī Puṣhtānạh, political history of Lodi dynasty of Afghanistan; includes biographical sketches of noted personalities of the tribe
Milī atal Ghāzī Wazīr Muḥammad Akbar Khān, on the life of Ghāzī Wazīr Muḥammad Akbar Khān, d. 1847, a national hero of Afghanistan
Da Puṣhto pakhwānay Alafbe, Brief history of Pushto script
Lughawī ṡeṛanah, Pushto words analysis
Makhārij al-hurūf, annotation and commentary on a work of Arabic phonetics by Avicenna

References 

Pashto-language poets
Pashtun people
1921 births
2004 deaths
20th-century Afghan poets